Ripley is an upcoming American psychological thriller television series based on Patricia Highsmith's 1955 crime novel The Talented Mr. Ripley. Starring Andrew Scott as sociopathic con artist Tom Ripley, Johnny Flynn as Dickie Greenleaf and Dakota Fanning as Marge Sherwood, the eight-episode limited series was created, written and directed by Steven Zaillian. Ripley was originally set to air on Showtime, but in February 2023 the series was moved to Netflix. It is expected to air in late 2023 or early 2024.

Premise
In 1960s New York, Tom Ripley is hired by a wealthy man to convince his wayward son to return home from Italy. But Tom's introduction to Dickie Greenleaf's leisurely life abroad "is the first step into a complex life of deceit, fraud and murder".

Development

On September 25, 2019, it was announced that Andrew Scott had been cast as Tom Ripley in Ripley, a television series to be adapted from Patricia Highsmith's Ripley novels. A series order of eight episodes was commissioned by Showtime, to be written and directed by Steven Zaillian, who pitched the series to the network. Johnny Flynn was cast as Dickie Greenleaf in January 2020, and in March 2021, Dakota Fanning was cast as Marge Sherwood. Eliot Sumner joined the cast in a recurring role in December 2021.

Zaillian serves as executive producer alongside Garrett Basch, Guymon Casady, Ben Forkner, Sharon Levy, and Philipp Keel, with Scott as a producer. The series was co-produced by Showtime and Endemol Shine North America in association with Entertainment 360 and Filmrights. Though designed as a limited series, further seasons are a possibility. Shooting was originally planned to begin in Italy in September 2020, but was later delayed to 2021. Robert Elswit was the cinematographer of all eight episodes, and shot with Arri Alexa LF digital cameras. In February 2023, the series was in the early stages of post-production.

In February 2023, Deadline Hollywood reported that the series would be moving from Showtime to Netflix. It is expected to air in late 2023 or early 2024.

References

External links
 
 

2020s American crime drama television series
English-language Netflix original programming
English-language television shows
Fraud in television
Serial drama television series
Serial killers in television
Television series about fictional serial killers
Television shows based on American novels
Television shows filmed in Italy
Television shows set in Italy
Upcoming drama television series
Upcoming Netflix original programming
Works by Steven Zaillian